The Rennell starling (Aplonis insularis) is a species of starling in the family Sturnidae. It is endemic to Rennell Island in the Solomon Islands.

The plumage of the Rennell starling is blackish with a green-blue gloss. It has a yellow-orange eye and a short tail. It is an abundant bird of tropical moist lowland forests, secondary growth and coconut plantations.

References

Rennell starling
Birds of Rennell Island
Rennell starling
Taxonomy articles created by Polbot